Krasnokamsk is a town in Perm Krai, Russia, located on the north bank of the Kama River,  west of Perm, the administrative center of the krai. Population:

History
Foundation of the town is associated with the construction of the Kama paper mill. 1930 is considered to be the date of the foundation. The settlement was originally called Bumstroy, but in 1933 it was renamed Krasnokamsk and was granted urban-type settlement status. In 1938, it was granted town status.

The construction of the paper mill lead to the emergence of the Zakamsk CHP and Goznak paper and printing factory. In 1942, on the basis of evacuees from Moscow Oblast enterprise was created metal grid factory.

In 1934, oil was found on the factory's territory and in 1936 the extraction of petroleum began. In 1943, an oil refinery was built. Light and food industry factories were built later.

Administrative and municipal status
Within the framework of administrative divisions, it is, together with the work settlement of Overyata and seventy-two rural localities, incorporated as the town of krai significance of Krasnokamsk—an administrative unit with the status equal to that of the districts. As a municipal division, the town of Krasnokamsk is incorporated as Krasnokamskoye Urban Settlement within Krasnokamsky Municipal District and serves as the municipal district's administrative center. The work settlement of Overyata and the seventy-two rural localities are grouped into one urban settlement and one rural settlement within Krasnokamsky Municipal District.

Transportation
Krasnokamsk has advantageous transport position. A  branch line connect it with the main Perm–Moscow railway. Important highway runs through Krasnokamsk and connects Perm, Ochyor, and Igra (in the Udmurt Republic). The town is connected by bus with other destinations. During Soviet times, river transport also functioned, allowing to reach the left bank of the Kama faster.

References

Notes

Sources

External links
Official website of Krasnokamsk 
Unofficial website of Krasnokamsk 

Cities and towns in Perm Krai
Populated places on the Kama River